Washington Township is one of fourteen townships in Carroll County, Indiana. As of the 2010 census, its population was 549 and it contained 274 housing units.

History
Washington Township was organized in 1835.

Geography

Unincorporated towns
 Deer Creek

Adjacent townships
 Washington Township, Cass County (northeast)
 Deer Creek Township, Cass County (southeast)
 Carrollton (south)
 Jackson (southwest)
 Liberty (west)
 Clinton Township, Cass County (northwest)

Major highways
  Indiana State Road 29
  Indiana State Road 218

Cemeteries
The township contains two cemeteries: Hopewell and Rock Creek.

References
 United States Census Bureau cartographic boundary files
 U.S. Board on Geographic Names

External links
 Indiana Township Association
 United Township Association of Indiana

Townships in Carroll County, Indiana
Lafayette metropolitan area, Indiana
Townships in Indiana
1835 establishments in Indiana